Thai Meteorological Department (TMD) has a total of 118 weather stations throughout Thailand, including 21 Agromet stations.

Weather stations in Thailand

Thailand is according to Thai Meteorological Department (TMD) for climatic observations divided into six regions: northern, northeastern, eastern, central, southern (west coast) and southern (east coast) Thailand.

Northeastern region

The northeastern region includes the 20 provinces:
{|
|- style="vertical-align:top;"
||
Loei
Nong Bua Lam Phu
Udon Thani
Nong Khai
Bueng Kan
Sakon Nakhon
Nakhon Phanom
Mukdahan
Kalasin
Chaiyaphum
||
Khon Kaen
Maha Sarakham
Roi Et
Yasothon
Amnat charoen
Ubon Ratchathani
Sisaket
Surin
Buriram
Nakhon Ratchasima
|}

TMD weather stations in northeastern Thailand
There are a total of 22 weather stations in northeastern Thailand, including 3 Agromet stations.

TMD weather stations

All TMD weather stations in Thailand have their own website. The weather forecasts are at 1.00, 4.00, 7.00, 10.00, 13.00, 16.00, 19.00 and 22.00 hour. The weather stations distribute the weather forecasts every day at 7.30, 8.30, 12.30,13.30,19.30 and 20.30 via FM radio broadcast, these include the weather forecasts of the neighboring weather stations.
When the weather station is located near an airport, the Royal Thai Air Force and civil aviation use their own weather station for the pilots' briefing.
In the northeastern region just four stations have a weather radar with a radius of 120 km or 240 km, they are station Sakon Nakhon, Khon Kaen, Ubon Ratchathani and Surin.

Agromet stations
Agromet stations deliver climatic data direct to TMD centers. Agromet stations distribute the weather forecasts every day at 1.00, 4.00, 7.00, 10.00, 13.00, 16.00, 19.00 and 22.00 hour via their own website.

Weather forecasts northeastern Thailand
{|
|-style="vertical-align:top;"
||
Loei.
Nong Bua Lamphu. 
Udon Thani. 
Nong Khai. 
Sakon Nakhon. 
Nakhon Phanom.
Mukdahan.
Kalasin.
Chaiyaphum.   
||
<ol start=25>
Khon Kaen. 
Kosum Phisai. 
Roi Et. 
Ubon Ratchathani and Ubon Ratchathani Agromet. 
Sisaket Agromet. 
Surin and Tha Tum. 
Buriram and Nang Rong. 
Nakhon Ratchasima, Chok Chai and Pakchong Agromet. 
||
|}

Notes
 In this overview of weather stations, an Agromet station is omitted if it is located close to a TMD weather station.

References

Meteorological stations
Meteorological Department weather stations in northeastern Thailand